Guépahouo is a town in south-central Ivory Coast. It is a sub-prefecture of Oumé Department in Gôh Region, Gôh-Djiboua District.

Guépahouo was a commune until March 2012, when it became one of 1126 communes nationwide that were abolished.

In 2021, the population of the sub-prefecture of Guépahouo was 28,007.

Villages
The 6 villages of the sub-prefecture of Guépahouo and their population in 2014 are:
 Bodiba  (2 150)
 Digbohouo  (2 141)
 Donsohouo  (4 080)
 Douagbo  (802)
 Guépahouo  (20 143)
 Sakahouo  (4 482)

References

Sub-prefectures of Gôh
Former communes of Ivory Coast